Oak Bluffs is a census-designated place (CDP) in the town of Oak Bluffs, Dukes County, Massachusetts, United States, on the island of Martha's Vineyard. The Oak Bluffs CDP comprises the most densely settled part of the town, including the neighborhoods of Vineyard Highlands, Harthaven, and part of Eastville.

Oak Bluffs was first listed as a CDP prior to the 2020 census with a population of 2,324.

Demographics

2020 census

Note: the US Census treats Hispanic/Latino as an ethnic category. This table excludes Latinos from the racial categories and assigns them to a separate category. Hispanics/Latinos can be of any race.

References 

Census-designated places in Dukes County, Massachusetts
Census-designated places in Massachusetts